The 2012 Adamawa State gubernatorial election occurred in Nigeria on February 4, 2012. The PDP nominee Murtala Nyako won the election, defeating Markus Gundiri of the ACN.

Murtala Nyako emerged as PDP candidate. He picked Bala James Ngilari as his running mate. Markus Gundiri was the ACN candidate with Abdulrazak Namdas as his running mate.

Electoral system
The Governor of Adamawa State is elected using the plurality voting system.

Primary election

PDP primary
The PDP primary election was held on October 24, 2011. Murtala Nyako emerged PDP flag bearer after polling 854 votes and defeating his closest rival, Umar Ardo who withdrew from the race. He picked Bala James Ngilari as his running mate.

ACN primary
The ACN primary election was held in 2011. Markus Gundiri emerged the party's flag bearer and picked Abdulrazak Namdas as his running mate.

Results

By local government area
Here are the results of the election by local government area for the two major parties. Green represents LGAs won by Murtala Nyako. Blue represents LGAs won by Markus Gundiri.

References 

Adamawa State gubernatorial elections
Adamawa State gubernatorial election
Adamawa State gubernatorial election